Allocasuarina helmsii is a shrub of the genus Allocasuarina native to both South Australia and  Western Australia (in the central Wheatbelt and Goldfields-Esperance regions).

References

helmsii
Rosids of Western Australia
Fagales of Australia
Dioecious plants